General Cobb may refer to:

Amasa Cobb (1823–1905), Union Army brevet brigadier general of volunteers
David Cobb (Massachusetts politician) (1748–1830), U.S. Army major general
Henry H. Cobb (1920–2013), U.S. Army major general
Howell Cobb (1815–1868), Confederate States Army major general
Patrick Cobb (fl. 1990s–2020s), U.S. Air Force major general
Thomas Reade Rootes Cobb (1823–1862), Confederate States Army brigadier general

See also
Alexander Cobbe (1870–1931), British Indian Army general